"One World, One Flame" is a single by Canadian rock singer Bryan Adams, co-written with Jim Vallance and Gretchen Peters, released in 2010 in Austria and Germany (See 2010 in music).

Background
Adams was asked by the German television network, ARD to write a song for them to use when broadcasting the 2010 Winter Olympics. In November 2009 he rang Jim Vallance to seek help in writing and composing the song. With both thinking the ARD wanted something up beat, they recorded an up-tempo rock song and sent the ARD a demo. They were however mistaken, the ARD wanted an "inspirational ballad". With this setback, Adams and Vallance didn't discuss the project for a month. In the meantime Vallance was able to discover a short snippet of music he'd recorded a few years back. It was however just a simple two-bar phrase, its duration no more than 5 seconds. Seeing it as a good starting point for the second phase of development, he sent it to Adams.

With this snippet of music, Adams and Vallance started e-mailing lyrics back-and-forth, as they had done with Adams previous album, 11. Given the nature of their assignment, the lyrics needed to be olympics themed. They had problems writing the song, so Adams asked for some help from Gretchen Peters. She was able to contribute with a new set of lyrics, which according to Vallance, were able to capture the "Olympic spirit" perfectly.

Track listing

Chart positions

References

2010 singles
Bryan Adams songs
Songs written by Jim Vallance
Songs written by Gretchen Peters
Songs written by Bryan Adams
2010 Winter Olympics
Olympic theme songs
Universal Music Group singles
2010 songs